Froriepia is the scientific name of two genera of organisms and may refer to:

Froriepia (arachnid), a genus of mites in the family Acaridae
Froriepia (plant), a genus of plants in the family Apiaceae